The following is a complete list of the filmography of American actor Sean Penn.

Filmography

Acting

Television

Stage

Other media

Directing

Film

Music videos

References

Sources

External links

 
 
 
 

American filmographies
Male actor filmographies